Namiae is a Koiarian language of Oro Province, Papua New Guinea.

It is spoken in Kokoro, Kuae, Sorefuna, Tahama, and Ubuvara villages of Afore Rural LLG.

Literature
A New Testament in Namiai was published in 2004.

References

Languages of Papua New Guinea
Koiarian languages